"Up!" is a song recorded by the Filipino sibling groups Bini and BGYO released on 1 April 2022, as the tie-in with their documentary film "Bini and BGYO Dubai Adventures". The track is the first collaboration single of the sibling groups, composed by singer-songwriters Angela Ken, Sabine Cerrado (known mononymously as SAB), Lian Kyla and Trisha Denise along with the producer Jonathan Manalo.

Composition and lyrics 
"Up!" is a groovy song that runs for a total of three minutes and fifty-two seconds. The song is set in common time with a tempo of 120 beats per minute and written in the key of G minor. The lyrics were written in English and Filipino that tackles about never giving up on achieving one's dreams; arranged by Theo Martel and Jonathan Manalo.

Background and release 
"Up!" was first heard and announced on 22 March 2022, through an audio sampler released by Star Music on different social media platforms. "Up!" official track was released on 1 April 2022, accompanied by its lyric and music video uploaded on YouTube by Star Music.

Reception 
Philippine Daily Inquirer mentioned in an article, ""Up" tells the group's struggle to achieve greater heights and make their respective marks in the P-pop industry and on the international music scene". Danielle Domingo of MYX Global explained "the catchy Tagalog-English track inspires listeners to go for one's dream and that hard work does pay off".

Promotion

Television 
On 12 June 2022, the sibling groups performed "Up!" on the Philippines musical variety show ASAP Natin 'To, along with the composers of the track Angela Ken, Sabine Cerrado and Trisha Denise.

Music video 
The music video of "Up!" is a compilation of video clips integrated with dance performance of Bini and BGYO, directed by Michael Perz. It was presented and set in Dubai, United Arab Emirates that features the Dubai itineraries of the sibling groups, interspersed with the dance choreography.

Credits and personnel 
All song credits are adapted from the official music video of "Up!" released by Star Music in YouTube, unless otherwise noted.
Words & Music by Angela Ken, Sabine Cerrado, Lian Kyla, Trisha Denise & Jonathan Manalo
Arranged by Theo Martel & Jonathan Manalo
Bass by Karel Honasan
Guitars by Janno Queyquep
Strings Programmed by Arnold Buena
Vocal Production & Arrangement by Jonathan Manalo
BINI vocal coaching/arrangement: Anna Graham
BGYO vocal coaching/arrangement: Jerwin Nicomedez
Mix & Mastered by Tim Recla at The Purple Room
Over-all produced by Jonathan Manalo
Performance Director / UP MV Videographer & Director - Michael Perz

Release history

See also
BGYO discography
List of BGYO live performances

References

External links
 

BGYO songs
Bini (group) songs
2022 songs
Star Music singles